A tram-train is a type of light rail vehicle that meets the standards of a light rail system (usually an urban street running tramway), but which also meets national mainline standards permitting operation alongside mainline trains. This allows services that can utilise both existing urban light rail systems and mainline railway networks and stations. It combines the urban accessibility of a tram or light rail with a mainline train's greater speed in the suburbs.

The modern tram-train concept was pioneered by the German city of Karlsruhe in the late 1980s, resulting in the creation of the Karlsruhe Stadtbahn. This concept is often referred to as the Karlsruhe model, and it has since been adopted in other cities such as Mulhouse in France and in Kassel, Nordhausen and Saarbrücken in Germany.

An inversion of the concept is a train-tram; a mainline train adapted to run on-street in an urban tramway, also known as the Zwickau Model.

Technology
The tram-train often is a type of interurban — that is, they link separate towns or cities, according to George W. Hilton and John F. Due's definition.

Most tram-trains are standard gauge, which facilitates sharing track with main-line trains. Exceptions include Alicante Tram and Nordhausen, which are metre gauge.

Tram-train vehicles are dual-equipped to suit the needs of both tram and train operating modes, with support for multiple electrification voltages if required and safety equipment such as train stops and other railway signalling equipment. The Karlsruhe and Saarbrücken systems use "PZB" or "Indusi" automatic train protection, so that if the driver passes a signal at stop the emergency brakes are applied.

History
The idea is not new; in the early 20th century, interurban streetcar lines often operated on dedicated rights-of-way between towns, while running on street trackage in town.  The first interurban to emerge in the United States was the Newark and Granville Street Railway in Ohio, which opened in 1889. In 1924, in Hobart, Australia, sharing of tracks between trams and trains was proposed.

The difference between modern tram-trains and the older interurban and radial railways is that tram-trains are built to meet mainline railway standards, rather than ignoring them. An exception is the United States' River Line in New Jersey, which runs along freight tracks with time separation; passenger trains run by day, and freight by night.

Existing systems

Asia

Japan 

Fukui: Fukui Fukubu Line

Europe

Austria 

 Gmunden: Traunsee Tram (2018)
 Vienna: Badner Bahn

Denmark 

 Aarhus Letbane

France 

 Lyon: Rhônexpress (2010)
 Lyon: Tram-train de l'ouest lyonnais
 Mulhouse: Mulhouse tramway
 Nantes: Nantes tram-train (2011)
 Île-de-France (Paris region):
 Tramway Line 4 (2006)
 Tramway Line 11 Express (2017)

Germany 

 Chemnitz: Chemnitz Tramway
 Karlsruhe: Stadtbahn Karlsruhe
 Kassel: Kassel RegioTram (2006)
 Nordhausen: Trams in Nordhausen
 Saarbrücken: Saarbahn

Hungary 

 Szeged-Hódmezővásárhely tram-train (2021)

Italy 

 Sassari: Metrosassari

Netherlands 

 The Hague-Rotterdam: RandstadRail

Portugal 

 Porto:
 Porto Metro Line B/Bx (opening 2005)
 Porto Metro Line C (opening 2005)

Spain 

 Alicante: Alicante Tram (2007)
 Mallorca: Mallorca rail network
 Cádiz: Cádiz Bay tram-train (opening 2022)

United Kingdom 

 Sheffield - Rotherham: Sheffield Supertram (2018)
 Cardiff: South Wales Metro (2023)

North America
Puebla, Mexico: Puebla-Cholula Tourist Train

Proposed systems

Africa
 The October 6th Tram system (The O6T), Cairo, Egypt

Asia
 Haifa–Nazareth, Israel
 Keelung Light Rail Transit (Nangang-Keelung), Taiwan

Europe
 Braunschweig, Germany
 Bratislava, Slovakia
 Cardiff, United Kingdom. Wales & Borders franchise: South Wales Valley Lines (2022 - 2023) - rolling stock currently under construction.
 Erlangen, Germany – an extension of Straßenbahn Nürnberg not initially planned to use mainline rail tracks but proposed to do so in the future. The planned line to Herzogenaurach replicates a former mainline rail line
 Greater Manchester, United Kingdom. Proposed extensions to the Manchester Metrolink network.
 Grenoble, France
 Groningen, Netherlands
 île de France (Paris region), France. The system is called Tram Express by the transport authority STIF:  1 line already exists (Tramway Line 11 Express) and 2 lines are scheduled (Tramway Lines 12 Express and 13 Express). The light train rolling stock will only roll on national rail network in western line (Line 13 Express) a short section of 3.6 km (2.2 mi) is an urban tram section of the 19 km (11.8 mi) line. The southern line (Line 12 Express) is a 20 km (12.4 mi) line, 10 km will be tram section and the 10 km another will roll on national rail network.
 Kiel, Germany
 Kyiv, Ukraine
 Košice, Slovakia (in planning phase)
 León, Spain
 Liberec — Jablonec nad Nisou, Czech Republic
 Linköping, Sweden
 Manresa, Spain
 Metro Mondego, Coimbra, Portugal
 RijnGouweLijn, Netherlands
 Metro de Sevilla. Seville has one metro line and one tram line that are not connected, but the long-term intention is to link the metro and tram systems.
 Sevastopol 
 Strasbourg, France
 Szeged, Hungary. Two other destinations are being considered as of January 2022 besides the Szeged - Hódmezővásárhely line, which entered operation in November 2021. The Szeged - Subotica (Serbia) line is in early planning phase. A preparatory study was also completed for the Szeged - Makó line, but the estimated costs were high, and it is also dependent on a new road-rail bridge over the river Tisa only in planning phase as of now.
 TramCamp, Camp de Tarragona, Catalonia, Spain
 Wrocław, Poland (2005) — 600 V DC/3 kV DC
 Riga, Latvia
 Tampere, Finland
 Turku, Finland
 West Midlands conurbation, United Kingdom. Proposed extensions to the West Midlands Metro.

Oceania
 Adelaide, South Australia – On June 5, 2008, the Government of South Australia announced plans for train-tram operation on the Adelaide Metro's Outer Harbor/Grange train lines and City West-Glenelg tramline extension as part of a 10-year A$2 billion public transport upgrade.

South America
 Bogotá Commuter Rail (RegioTram), Colombia
 Cali, Colombia

Vehicles
Models of tram designed for tram-train operation include:
 Alstom's RegioCitadis and Citadis Dualis, derived from the Citadis
 Bombardier Flexity Link and Bombardier Flexity Swift
 Siemens S70
 Stadler Citylink

Train-tram

Europe 

 Zwickau: Trams in Zwickau – on-board diesel generator (light-weight RegioSprinter diesel railbuses that also operate on street tramway)

North America 
Austin, Texas: Capital MetroRail – commuter rail that shares more commonality with train-tram operation, with downtown street running and usage of mainline track. Uses diesel multiple units.
New Jersey: River Line – diesel multiple units using main line tracks between Trenton, New Jersey and Camden, New Jersey in a time-sharing agreement with the freight companies.

See also 
 Grooved rail
 Light rail
 Stadtbahn

References

External links 
 TramTrain - the 2nd generation: Searching for the 'ideal' TramTrain-city
 New TramTrain for Mulhouse -  Reportage and images (English/German)
 Construction of the TramTrain system in Mulhouse with images (English/German)
 tram-train of Karlsruhe transformed in a subway in the center
 Leeds City Region proposal 
 (Jane's) Urban Transit Systems

Electric public transport
Passenger rail transport